Rudi Dharmalingam (born ) is an English actor of stage and screen.

Early life and education
Dharmalingam was born in Maidstone, Kent. After joining the National Youth Theatre in 1998, he obtained a BA in performing arts at the University of Salford in 2002.

Career
His notable television portrayals include Tariq Mistry in the Channel 4 soap opera Hollyoaks (2010), James Cutler in the BBC One legal drama The Split (2018–2022), Nik Katira in the Australian psychological mystery Wakefield (2021). He has appeared in numerous theatre productions, including Broadway's The History Boys (2006) and West End's Hamlet (2015). Dharmalingam's minor TV roles include programmes such as The Bill, New Tricks, Coronation Street, Casualty, Doctor Who, Rellik, Electric Dreams and Our Girl.

Filmography

Film

Television

References

External links

1980s births
Living people
Alumni of the University of Salford
English male film actors
English people of Sri Lankan descent
English male stage actors
English male television actors
Male actors from Kent
People from Maidstone